Siobhain Ann McDonagh (born 20 February 1960) is a British Labour Party politician who has been the Member of Parliament (MP) for Mitcham and Morden since the 1997 general election. She served as an Assistant Whip in the Labour Government, but was dismissed following comments regarding a leadership contest to replace prime minister Gordon Brown.

Early life
McDonagh's father was a builder and her mother a nurse who moved to the area in 1958, she was educated at the Holy Cross School, New Malden and later studied Politics at the University of Essex.

She was a clerical officer for the DHSS between 1981 and 1983, a receptionist at the Wandsworth Homeless Persons Unit from 1984 to 1986, and a housing adviser from 1986 to 1988. Prior to being elected to Parliament she worked as a Development Manager for Battersea Churches Housing Trust from 1988 to 1997. She also served as a councillor on London Borough of Merton for Colliers Wood ward between 1982 and 1998, chairing the Housing Committee between 1990 and 1995, being instrumental in the rebuilding of Phipps Bridge Estate.

Parliamentary career
McDonagh was first elected in the 1997 election for Labour, having been selected through an all-women shortlist, defeating the Conservative incumbent, Dame Angela Rumbold, to whom she had lost in the 1987 and 1992 General Elections, on a swing of 11.6% of the votes, similar to the national average.

After the 2001 election, prime minister Tony Blair offered McDonagh the position of Parliamentary Undersecretary of State at the Department for Communities and Local Government. She declined the offer and remained a backbencher. After the May 2005 general election, she served as Parliamentary Private Secretary to Dr. John Reid while he was Secretary of State for Defence and from May 2006 to June 2007 Secretary of State for the Home Department. She was appointed to the position of Assistant Whip in June 2007 in the re-shuffle brought about by Gordon Brown becoming prime minister.

On 12 September 2008, McDonagh became the first member of the government to call for a leadership contest, resulting in dismissal from her government post.

In June 2015, McDonagh nominated Liz Kendall, considered the Blairite candidate, for leadership of the Labour Party. She supported Owen Smith in the failed attempt to replace Jeremy Corbyn in the 2016 Labour Party leadership election.

In 2018, McDonagh offered her support to Labour MP Chris Leslie when he faced a confidence motion from his CLP, a vote he subsequently lost.

McDonagh endorsed Jess Phillips in the 2020 Labour Party leadership election.

Middle East 
In March 2003, McDonagh voted in favour of the country going to war with Iraq. She has consistently voted against any inquiry into the Iraq War.

In December 2015, she was among the minority of Labour MPs who voted in favour of extending UK military airstrikes against ISIL into Syria. She has written that it was a decision "not easy to come to".

McDonagh abstained from a vote about the UK's support for Saudi Arabia's military campaign in Yemen. The vote was defeated by a majority of 90. As noted by commentators, the vote would have succeeded if 97 Labour MPs had not abstained.

Expenses

In April 2000, her office sent a party political questionnaire to 200 of her constituents using parliamentary resources; a spokesman for McDonagh subsequently said it was a "mistake". McDonagh promised to apologise and reimburse the cost to her office.

In 2007, her expenditure on stationery and postage attracted criticism, being more than any other MP's for postage from 2003 to 2006. In total, her office spent £126,833 on postage in the four-year period, an average of almost £32,000 per year. When adding in stationery costs, the expenditure was approximately £50,000 in both 2004–05 and 2006–07.  McDonagh responded stating, "I believe the job of an MP is to keep in contact with constituents on important issues."

Mobile phone theft

In October 2010, her mobile phone was stolen from her car. Although not implicated in the robbery itself, it became evident that The Sun newspaper had accessed the phone, including messages stored on it. She sued the paper and in March 2013 won "substantial damages."

Antisemitism comments
In 2019, McDonagh was criticised by some left-wing members of the party after she appeared to agree with a statement put forward by John Humphrys on BBC Radio 4's Today programme. McDonagh said anti-semitism is a problem in the Labour Party, because "part of [Labour] politics, of hard left politics, [is] to be against capitalists and to see Jewish people as the financiers of capital." When Humphrys asked her if that meant that "to be anti-capitalist you have to be antisemitic", McDonagh replied, "Yes."

Personal life
McDonagh lives in Colliers Wood in her constituency with her sister Baroness McDonagh, who was General Secretary of the Labour Party between 1998 and 2001, during Tony Blair's premiership. She is a Roman Catholic of Irish descent.

She was a patron of Leap Forward Employment – a now defunct community interest company that found work for adults with mental health issues.

See also
 News media phone hacking scandal reference lists

References

External links 
 Siobhain McDonagh MP official site
 
 BBC Politics

1960 births
Living people
Labour Party (UK) MPs for English constituencies
Female members of the Parliament of the United Kingdom for English constituencies
Councillors in the London Borough of Merton
People from the London Borough of Merton
Alumni of the University of Essex
English people of Irish descent
English Roman Catholics
UK MPs 1997–2001
UK MPs 2001–2005
UK MPs 2005–2010
UK MPs 2010–2015
UK MPs 2015–2017
UK MPs 2017–2019
UK MPs 2019–present
20th-century British women politicians
21st-century British women politicians
20th-century English women
20th-century English people
21st-century English women
21st-century English people
Women councillors in England